|}

This is a list of electoral district results of the 1908 Western Australian election.

Results by Electoral district

Albany

Balkatta

Beverley

Boulder

Brown Hill

Bunbury

Canning

Claremont

Collie

Coolgardie

Cue

Dundas

East Fremantle

East Perth

Forrest

Fremantle

Gascoyne

Geraldton

Greenough

Guildford

Hannans

Irwin

Ivanhoe

Kalgoorlie

Kanowna

Katanning

Kimberley

Menzies 

 This result was declared void and was contested again in the 1908 Menzies state by-election.

Mount Leonora

Mount Magnet

Mount Margaret

Murchison

Murray

Nelson

North Fremantle

North Perth

Northam

Perth

Pilbara

Roebourne

South Fremantle

Subiaco

Sussex

Swan

Toodyay

Wellington

West Perth

Williams

Yilgarn

York

See also 

 1908 Western Australian state election
 Members of the Western Australian Legislative Assembly, 1908–1911

References 

Results of Western Australian elections
1908 elections in Australia